Accademia (Italian for "academy") often refers to:

 The Galleria dell'Accademia, an art museum in Florence
 The Gallerie dell'Accademia, an art museum in Venice

Accademia may also refer to:

Academies of art

 The Accademia Carrara di Belle Arti di Bergamo, an art school and museum in Bergamo
 The Accademia di Architettura di Mendrisio, a Swiss school of architecture 
 The Accademia di Belle Arti di Bari, an art school in Bari
 The Accademia di Belle Arti di Bologna, also known as the Accademia Clementina
 The Accademia di Belle Arti di Carrara, an art school in Carrara
 The Accademia di Belle Arti di Firenze, an art school in Florence
 The Accademia di Belle Arti di Milano "Brera" or Brera Academy, an art school in Milan
 The Accademia di Belle Arti di Napoli, an art school in Naples
 The Accademia di Belle Arti di Roma, an art school in Rome
 The Accademia di Belle Arti di Torino "Albertina" or Accademia Albertina, an art school in Turin
 The Accademia di Belle Arti di Venezia, an art school in Venice
 The Accademia di Belle Arti Gian Bettino Cignaroli di Verona, or Academy of Fine Arts, Verona, also known as Accademia Cignaroli
 The Nuova Accademia di Belle Arti, a private art school in Milan

Learned societies
 The Accademia Angelica-Constantiniana di lettere, arti e scienze or Angelica-Constantiniana Academy of Arts and Sciences, founded in Rome in 1949
 The Accademia degli Arcadi, a literary academy founded in Rome in 1690, also known as
 Accademia dell'Arcadia,
 Pontificia Accademia degli Arcadi
 The Accademia degli Incamminati, founded in about 1580 in Bologna, also known as
 Accademia dei Desiderosi or
 Accademia dei Carracci
 The Accademia Cosentina,  founded in Cosenza in 1511, also known at various times as
 Accademia Parassiana
 Accademia Telesiana
 Accademia dei Costanti
 Accademia dei Negligenti and
 Accademia dei Pescatori Cratilidi
 The Accademia degli Incogniti, founded in Venice in 1630
 The Accademia degli Infiammati, a philosophical and literary academy founded in 1540 in Padua
 The Accademia degli Intronati, founded in Siena between 1525 and 1527
 The Accademia degli Svogliati in 17th-century Florence
 The Accademia dei Georgofili, a learned society established in Florence in 1753
 The Accademia dei Lincei, a scientific academy founded in 1603 in Rome
 The Accademia dei Risvegliati, founded in Pistoia in the 17th century
 The Accademia dei Secreti or Academia Secretorum Naturae, founded by Giovambattista Della Porta in the 16th century
 The Accademia del Cimento, a scientific society founded in Florence in 1657
 The Accademia della Crusca, a learned society founded in Florence in 1583
 The Accademia delle Arti del Disegno, a society of artists in Florence
 The Accademia delle Scienze dell'Istituto di Bologna or Academy of Sciences of the Institute of Bologna, an academic society in Bologna, founded in 1714
 The Accademia di San Luca, an association of artists founded in 1577 in Rome
 The Accademia Fiorentina, a philosophical and literary academy founded in Florence in 1540 as the
 Accademia degli Umidi
 The Accademia Galileiana, a learned society in Padova, variously  known during its history as
 Accademia dei Ricovrati
 Accademia di Arte Agraria
 Accademia di Scienze Lettere e Arti
 Accademia Patavina di Scienze, Lettere ed Arti
 The Accademia Musicale Chigiana, a musical institution in Siena
 The Accademia Nazionale delle Scienze, the Italian national academy of science, founded in Verona in 1782, also known as
 L’Accademia Nazionale delle Scienze detta dei XL or
 Accademia dei XL 
 The Accademia Nazionale di Santa Cecilia, a musical institution in Rome
 The Accademia Neoplatonica or Platonic Academy (Florence), a 15th-century discussion group in Florence centred round Marsilio Ficino
 The Accademia Pontaniana, a scientific academy founded in Naples in the 15th Century
 Any Pontifical academy of the Roman Catholic Church or other Roman Academies, including
 The Accademia di Raffaele Sanzio
 The Accademia Filarmonica
 The Pontificia Accademia Alfonsiana
 The Pontificia Accademia di Conferenze Storico-Giuridiche
 The Pontificia Accademia "Cultorum Martyrum", or Pontifical Academy of Martyrs, founded 1879
 The Pontificia Accademia dei Nobili Ecclesiastici
 The Pontificia Accademia della Immacolata Concezione
 The Pontificia Accademia delle Scienze, or Pontifical Academy of Sciences, founded in 1603
 The Pontificia Accademia delle Scienze Sociali, or Pontifical Academy of Social Sciences, founded 1994
 The Pontificia Accademia di Latinità, or Pontifical Academy for Latin, established in 2012
 The Pontificia Accademia di Religione Cattolica
 The Pontificia Accademia Ecclesiastica
 The Pontificia Accademia Liturgica
 The Pontificia Accademia Mariana Internazionale, or Pontifical Academy of Mary, established in 1946
 The Pontificia Accademia per la Vita, or Pontifical Academy for Life, founded in 1994
 The Pontificia Accademia Romana di Archeologia or Pontifical Academy of Archaeology, founded in 1810
 The Pontificia Accademia Romana di San Tommaso di Aquino, or Pontifical Academy of St. Thomas Aquinas, founded in 1879
 The Pontificia Accademia Teologica, or Pontifical Academy of Theology, founded in 1718
 The Pontificia Accademia Tiberina
 The Pontificia Insigne Accademia di Belle Arti e Letteratura dei Virtuosi al Pantheon, or Pontifical Academy of Fine Arts and Letters of the Virtuosi al Pantheon, established in 1542
 The Regia Accademia Medica
 The Reale Accademia d'Italia or Royal Academy of Italy, an academy of the Fascist period, active 1926–43

Other academies
 The Accademia Aeronautica, the Italian Air Force academy
 The Accademia di Agricoltura di Torino, founded in Turin in 1785
 The Accademia Filarmonica di Bologna, a music school in Bologna
 The Accademia Filarmonica di Verona, a music school in Verona
 The Accademia Italiana, a private university
 The Accademia Italiana Skopje, a fashion school in Skopje
 The Accademia Italiana Thailand, a fashion school in Bangkok
 The Accademia Navale di Livorno or Italian Naval Academy, the Italian naval training academy in Livorno
 The Accademia Nazionale d'Arte Drammatica Silvio D'Amico, founded in Rome in 1936
 The Accademia Reale di Torino, a defunct military academy
 The Accademia Vivarium Novum in Rome

Others
 Accademia Apulia, a non-profit organisation founded in April 2008 in London
 The Accademia bridge or Ponte dell'Accademia
 Accademia Daniel, an Israeli music ensemble
 The Accademia della Farnesina, a centre for sport and political education in fascist Italy, also known as
 Accademia fascista della Farnesina
 Accademia fascista maschile di educazione fisica
 The Accademia Filarmonica Romana, an orchestra based in Rome
 The Accademia Italiana di Lingua, a professional association of schools of Italian as a foreign language
 The Accademia Normanna or Norman Academy, a Florida association for the promotion of the arts, letters and humanities world-wide
 Piccola Accademia di Montisi, a musical association in Montisi, Tuscany

See also
 List of learned societies in Italy